Susilo Wonowidjojo is an Indonesian billionaire businessman.

Biography 
Wonowidjojo was born Cai Daoping in Kediri, East Java to a prominent Chinese Indonesian (Hokchia totok) family. He is the son of Surya Wonowidjojo, founder of Gudang Garam, a major Indonesian kretek (clove cigarette) manufacturer.

Susilo Wonowidjojo has been the President Director of PT Gudang Garam Tbk since June 2009. He served as Vice-President Director at PT Gudang Garam Tbk. He has been a Director of PT Gudang Garam Tbk since 1976.

Along with his family, Wonowidjojo owns Gudang Garam, the country's largest clove cigarette maker; the name translates to "salt warehouse". Shares hit a 4-year high in 2009 in the wake of a deal in which British American Tobacco bought a majority stake in its rival Bentoel International.

Susilo was named president in June, replacing a non-family member who left in February. He and his brother Sumarto sit on the company's board while their sister, Juni Setiawati, is a company commissioner. Their brother Rachman Halim ran the business until his death in 2008.

References

Wonowidjojo family
Indonesian businesspeople
Indonesian people of Chinese descent
Indonesian billionaires
Living people
People from Kediri (city)
Year of birth missing (living people)